Mexicali Rose may refer to:

 Mexicali Rose (1929 film), an American film starring Barbara Stanwyck and Sam Hardy
 Mexicali Rose (1939 film), an American film starring Gene Autry, Smiley Burnette, and Noah Beery
 "Mexicali Rose" (song), a popular song with music by Jack Tenney and lyrics by Helen Stone, published in 1923